"Alone" is a song by English singer-songwriter Jessie Ware. It was written by Ware, Sarah Aarons and Kid Harpoon, with production handled by Harpoon and Stint. The song was released through Island Records on 14 September 2017, as the third single from the singer-songwriter's third studio album, Glasshouse (2017).

Background
On 13 September 2017, Ware premiered the song on Annie Mac's BBC Radio 1 show, as Mac's "Hottest Record", alongside the official announcement of the album. "I definitely tried to rush this record, and then I got pregnant. I think by me getting pregnant, it actually made me take stock of what I had and actually realise that I could do better," Ware told Mac. Ware said of the song in a press release: "I'm so happy to be reunited with Kid Harpoon on this one. It's a song about stealing time with your loved one, and longing for the simple declaration that they want the same."

Critical reception
William Connolly of Gay Times felt the song "follows the great success of other new tracks Midnight and Selfish Love". Robin Murray of Clash deemed the song "a silken return, with Jessie's wonderfully soulful voice entwined with some of her most personal songwriting yet". Rob Hakimian of The 405 called it a "sultry song" and "choir-imbued power ballad".

Music video 
The official music video for the song premiered on 12 October 2017. It was directed by Charlie Robbins and filmed at Eltham Palace in London.

Track listing

Credits and personnel
Credits adapted from Tidal.

 Jessie Ware – songwriting, vocals
 Sarah Aarons – songwriting, background vocals
 Kid Harpoon – songwriting, production, background vocals
 Stint – production, engineering, drums, piano, programming, synthesizer
 Stuart Hawkes – mastering engineering
 Fabiana Palladino – background vocals
 Joy Joseph – background vocals
 Spike Stent – mixing

Charts

Certifications

Release history

References

2017 songs
2017 singles
Jessie Ware songs
Island Records singles
Songs written by Jessie Ware
Songs written by Kid Harpoon
Songs written by Sarah Aarons
2010s ballads